Barrow Association Football Club is an English football club based in the town of Barrow-in-Furness, Cumbria. Founded in 1901, the team began in that season's Lancashire League, joined the Lancashire Combination in its newly formed Second Division for the 1903–04 season, and were promoted to its First Division in 1905. In 1909, Barrow moved to the Holker Street ground where they have played ever since. They won the Lancashire Combination title in 1920–21, and were invited to join the newly formed Third Division North of the Football League for 1921–22.

Barrow spent most of the 19 seasons before the Football League was suspended for the Second World War in the bottom half of the table. They finished bottom of the league four times, were re-elected each time, and had three consecutive top-half finishes in the early 1930s, the best of which, fifth place in 1931–32, remains the club's highest finishing position. When the regional third tier was reorganised into national Third and Fourth Divisions in 1958, Barrow were placed in the fourth tier. After one bottom-placed finish and three more in the re-election positions, Barrow finished third in the 1966–67 Fourth Division and gained promotion to the third tier. They finished eighth in their first seasontheir highest finish in the four-tier Football Leaguebut were relegated two years later, finished bottom in 1970–71, but in 1971–72, at the eleventh time of asking, their application for re-election proved unsuccessful after a second vote. Their place was taken by Southern League runners-up Hereford United, who had received widespread attention during an FA Cup run that included their dramatic elimination of top-flight team Newcastle United in front of the television cameras.

Barrow struggled for seven seasons in the Northern Premier League (NPL) before joining the newly formed Alliance Premier League (APL), where they lasted four seasons before being relegated back to the NPL. They bounced straight back as 1983–84 title-winners, and yo-yoed between the two for the next 20 years, during which time the APL was renamed the Football Conference. They won further NPL titles in 1988–89 and 1997–98, and won their first national silverware, the FA Trophy, in the 1989–90 season, beating Leek Town 3–0 in the final they would win their second FA Trophy 20 years later, with an extra-time victory over Stevenage Borough. Barrow were expelled from the Conference in 1999 after financial mismanagement forced the club into liquidation. The NPL would not initially accept the reconstituted club as a member; it finally did so, under pressure from the Football Association, eight matches into the 1999–2000 season, and it took considerably longer for issues around the club's ownership to be resolved.

The non-league pyramid was restructured ahead of the 2004–05 season, and Barrow became founder members of the sixth-tier Conference North. After four seasons they were promoted via the play-offs to the Conference National, from which they were relegated after five years. Barrow won the 2014–15 Conference North title, and remained in the newly renamed National League until the 2019–20 season was initially suspended and then ended prematurely because of the COVID-19 pandemic, with Barrow four points clear at the top of the table. After protracted discussions, the clubs voted to decide the final tables on a points-per-game basis; Barrow's 70 points from 37 games made them champions, and returned them to the Football League after 48 years. They retained their status for the next two seasons, albeit with bottom-four finishes.

Key

Key to league record:
P – Played
W – Games won
D – Games drawn
L – Games lost
F – Goals for
A – Goals against
Pts – Points
Pos – Final position

Key to divisions:
Lancs Lge – Lancashire League
Lancs C 1 – Lancashire Combination Division 1
Lancs C 2 – Lancashire Combination Division 2
Div 3N – Football League Third Division North
Div 3 – Football League Third Division
Div 4 – Football League Fourth Division
League 2 – EFL League Two
NPL – Northern Premier League
NPL P – Northern Premier League Premier Division
APL – Alliance Premier League
Conf – Football Conference
Conf Nat – Conference National
Conf P – Conference Premier
Conf N – Conference North
Nat – National League

Key to rounds:
Group – Group stage
Prelim – Preliminary round
QR1 – First qualifying round
QR2 – Second qualifying round, etc.
R1 – First round
R2 – Second round, etc.
QF – Quarter-final
SF – Semi-final
F – Final
W – Winners

Details of the abandoned 1939–40 Football League season are shown in italics and appropriately footnoted.

Seasons

Notes

References

External links
Barrow A.F.C. official website

 
Barrow A.F.C.